Drobacia  is a genus of medium-sized air-breathing land snails, terrestrial pulmonate gastropod mollusks in the family Helicidae, the typical snails.

This genus was formerly a subgenus of the genus Chilostoma.

Species
Species within the genus Drobacia include:
 Drobacia banatica (Rossmässler, 1838) - type species
 Drobacia maeotica (Wenz, 1926)

References

Helicidae
Gastropod genera
Taxa named by Spiridon Brusina